Jean-Loup Amselle is a French anthropologist and ethnologist. He is director of studies emeritus at EHESS and former editor-in-chief of the Cahiers d’études africaines. Trained in social anthropology and in ethnology, Jean-Loup Amselle had realized several works in the field in Mali, in Côte d’Ivoire and in Guinea. He is the inventor of an 'anthropology of connections' (the way that a society feeds off different influences) and pursues research about themes like ethnicity, identity, interbreeding, but also about contemporary African art, and about multiculturalism, postcolonialism and subordinatism. In 1998, he led, with Emmanuelle Sibeud, a work dealing with Maurice Delafosse, one of the pioneers of French Africanist ethnology.

Selected works
 Amselle, Jean-Loup, and Elikia M'BOKOLO, eds. Au cœur de l'ethnie: ethnies, tribalisme et État en Afrique. La découverte, 2017.
 Amselle, Jean-Loup. "Logiques métisses: anthropologie de l'identité en Afrique et ailleurs." (1990).
 Amselle, Jean-Loup. L'Occident décroché. Stock, 2008.
 Amselle, Jean-Loup, and Emmanuelle Sibeud. "Maurice Delafosse." Entre orientalisme et ethnographie: l’itinéraire d’un africaniste (1870–1926)(Paris: Maisonneuve et Larose) (1998).

References 

French anthropologists
French ethnologists
1942 births
Chevaliers of the Légion d'honneur
Living people